Centre de Recherche Berbère (CRB) is a department at the Institut national des langues et civilisations orientales (INALCO) specializing in the Berber languages. The center is the oldest organization which focuses on Berber culture and language, being one of the very few to do so. It cooperates with the Institut royal de la culture amazighe du Maroc and programs at Moroccan universities.

The center was founded in 1990 by Salem Chaker and managed by him until the end of 2009. Since January 2010, it is headed by Abdellah Bounfour.

References

External links 
 Centre de Recherche Berbère - Accueil

Berber languages